Rocar ANEFS București was a Romanian professional football club from Bucharest, Romania, founded in 1953 and dissolved in 2009.

Chronology of names 

Note: 3 years of inactivity between 2002–2005, and the team was refounded as Rocar ANEFS București in the Liga IV.

History 
The club was founded under the name Asociaţia Sportivă a Uzinei de Autobuze București in 1953 and was sponsored by Rocar. They had a meteoric appearance in the forefront of Romanian football. Promoted in 1999 the club from Drumul Găzarului  has made way back two years later.

Stadium 
Rocar București played its home matches on the ANEFS Stadium, Bucharest, which has a capacity of 6,000 people, previously known as Rocar Stadium.

Notable former players

Notable managers 

 Dumitru Dumitriu
 Florin Marin
 Mihai Stoichiță
 Marius Șumudică

Honours 

Liga I:
Winners (0):, Best finish: 12th 1999–00

Liga II:
Runners-up (1): 1998–99

Liga III:
Winners (4): 1969–70, 1976–77, 1985–86, 1988–89
Runners-up (1): 1972–73

Liga IV:
Winners (1): 2005–06

Romanian Cup:
Runners-up (1): 2000–01

References 

 
Defunct football clubs in Romania
Football clubs in Bucharest
Association football clubs established in 1953
1953 establishments in Romania
Association football clubs disestablished in 2009
2009 disestablishments in Romania
Liga I clubs
Liga II clubs
Liga III clubs
Liga IV clubs